Virginia Vincent (May 3, 1918 – October 3, 2013) was an American film, television and theatre actress. She was known for playing the role of "Jennie Blake" in the 1958 film The Return of Dracula. Vincent died in October 2013, at the age of 95 in United States.

Partial filmography 

California Passage (1950) - Mazie (uncredited)
The Company She Keeps (1951) - Annabelle Bird (uncredited)
Taxi (1953) - Hortense (uncredited)
The Helen Morgan Story (1957) - Sue
The Return of Dracula (1958) - Jennie Blake
The Black Orchid (1958) - Alma Gallo
I Want to Live! (1958) - Peg
Perry Mason - The Case of the Green-Eyed Sister (1958) - Harriet Bain
Never Steal Anything Small (1959) - Ginger
The Real McCoys (1962) - Nancy Templeton
Love with the Proper Stranger (1963) - Anna
Navajo Run (1964) - Sarah Grog
Tony Rome (1967) - Sally Bullock
Sweet November (1968) - Mrs. Schumacher
Change of Habit (1969) - Miss Parker
Rabbit, Run (1970) - Margaret
The Million Dollar Duck (1971) - Eunice Hooper
The Baby (1973)
Airport 1975 (1974) - Gina Arriba - Passenger (uncredited)
Treasure of Matecumbe (1976) - Aunt Lou
The Hills Have Eyes (1977) - Ethel Carter
Amy (1981) - Edna Hancock
The Longshot (1986) - Waitress

References

External links 

Rotten Tomatoes profile

1918 births
2013 deaths
People from Goshen, New York
Actresses from New York (state)
American film actresses
American television actresses
American stage actresses
20th-century American actresses
21st-century American women